Mazhar ul Islam is a Pakistani short story writer and novelist. His short stories weave together themes of love, pain, ecstasy, separation and death.

Early life 

He was born on 4 August in Wazirabad in the northern Punjab  where his father had then been posted by the Forestry Department. After his father’s death in 1967, he moved to Islamabad.

Author 

Ul Islam's short stories reflect a new trend in Urdu prose. Influenced by the 'magical realism' of South American writers such as Gabriel Garcia Marquez,, he introduced this style in his native language. His works have been translated into Italian, Chinese, Japanese, English and several local and regional Pakistani languages.

Mazhar ul Islam served as Director General of the Pakistan Academy of Letters, as Executive Director of Lok Virsa and the Managing Director of the National Book Foundation. He has been awarded the President’s Pride of Performance for Literature and a medal for Revival of Folk Studies.

Publications 
 Mohabbat Murda Pholon ki Symphany 
 La stagione dell’amore,delle mandorle amare e delle piogge tarde  (Italian translation)
Mein, aap aur who (You, him and I)
Baton ki barish mein bhegti larki (A girl showering in the rain of words)
Khat mein post ki huee dopeher (An afternoon posted in a letter)
The season of love, bitter almonds and delayed rains
Ghoron ke sheher mein akela aadmi (A lonely man in the city of horses)
Gurrya ki aankh se sheher ko dekho (Look at the city with the eye of a doll)
Ay Khuda (O God)

References

1949 births
Living people
Pakistani male short story writers
Pakistani short story writers
Pakistani novelists
Recipients of the Pride of Performance
Urdu-language fiction writers
Pakistani Muslims
Urdu-language novelists
People from Wazirabad